Song Won-seok (born 16 December, 1988), is a South Korean actor. He is best known for his roles in television series Lovers of the Red Sky (2021), One the Woman (2021), and Business Proposal (2022).

Filmography

Television series

Television shows

Web shows

Awards and nominations

References

External links 

 Song Won-seok at Starhaus Entertainment
 
 

1988 births
Living people
South Korean male television actors
21st-century South Korean male actors